The 2012 Big 12 Conference women's soccer tournament was the postseason women's soccer tournament for the Big 12 Conference held from October 31 to November 4, 2012. The 7-match tournament was held at the Blossom Athletic Center in San Antonio, TX with a combined attendance of 2,928. The 8-team single-elimination tournament consisted of three rounds based on seeding from regular season conference play. The Baylor Lady Bears defeated the TCU Horned Frogs in the championship match to win their 1st conference tournament.

Regular season standings
Source:

Bracket

Awards

Most valuable player
Source:
Offensive MVP – Dana Larsen – Baylor
Defensive MVP – Vittoria Arnold – TCU

All-Tournament team

References 

 
Big 12 Conference Women's Soccer Tournament